Wangkulangkul's bent-toed gecko (Cyrtodactylus wangkulangkulae) is a species of lizard in the family Gekkonidae. The species is endemic to Thailand.

Etymology
The specific name, wangkulangkulae (feminine, genitive, singular), is in honor of Thai herpetologist Sansareeya Wangulangkul.

Geographic range
C. wangkulangkulae is found in southern Thailand, in Satun Province.

Habitat
The preferred natural habitat of C. wangkulangkulae is forest.

Description

Reproduction
The mode of reproduction of C. wangkulangkulae is unknown.

References

Further reading
Sumontha M, Pauwels OSG, Suwannakarn N, Nutatheera T, Sodob W (2014). "Cyrtodactylus wangkulangkulae (Squamata: Gekkonidae), a new Bent-toed Gecko from Satun Province, southern Thailand". Zootaxa 3821 (1): 116–124. (Cyrtodactylus wangkulangkulae, new species).

Cyrtodactylus
Reptiles described in 2014